The 24 Hrs Tour (advertised as Spring Tour 2017 and Summer Tour 2017) is the fifth concert tour by English recording artist, Olly Murs. The tour supports his fifth studio album, 24 Hrs (2016). Beginning March 2017, the tour played over 50 concerts in Europe and Asia.

Background
The tour was announced September 2016 on Murs various social media platforms. The first left of dates sold well, prompting a second leg of outdoor shows revealed in November 2016. Rehearsals began February 2017 in Brighton. Discussing his open air dates, Murs stated:
"A summer tour is not something I've done in a long time and there's places on it that I haven't been to in a while, so it'll be good to get out and see those people. The outdoor shows are always that little bit crazier. When you're in an arena, you can create more of a story on the stage, but for a festival or a park, it's all just about the live performance."

Critical reception
Shows in the UK were high praised amongst local critics. Lorna Hughes (Liverpool Echo) gave Murs performance in Liverpool five out of five stars. She wrote: "Olly is the consummate entertainer, and at times seems to be having even more fun than the audience. Between songs he shares how much he loves Liverpool and how a very honest Scouse lady in catering pointed out the giant spot on his face."

In Birmingham, Justine Halifax (Birmingham Mail) gave the concert four out of five stars. "He then delivered the party atmosphere that he had promised when he took to the stage. Accompanied by an amazing nine-piece band and four backing singers, the former X-Factor runner up, who announced that he was 'feeling a little bit frisky', then romped through hits from his five albums."

Matilda Egere-Cooper (London Evening Standard) gave the shows in London three out of five stars. She states: "With nods to Robbie Williams and Justin Timberlake, his gig was 90 minutes of fun-filled showmanship from a singer  who's learned he's better off  sticking to his strengths. Strokes of laddish humour, dad-dancing and chart-toppers such as Heart Skips a Beat and Dance With Me Tonight  all appeared among the fancy visuals and pyrotechnics."

Opening acts

Louisa Johnson  - 
Bodg & Matt 
James Cusack 
Simon Morykin 
Simon Pinkham 
Dave Kelly 
Mike Toolan 
Rob Ellis 
Matt Lissack 
Dan Kelly 
Rob & Katy 
Steve Power 
Mark Wright (TV personality) 
Scott Mills 
Pete Snodden 
Eoghan McDermott

Setlist
The following setlist was obtained from the concert, held on 17 March 2017, at the Manchester Arena in Manchester, England. It does not represent all concerts during the tour.
"You Don't Know Love"
"Wrapped Up"
"Unpredictable" 
"Grow Up"
"Flaws"
"Up"
"Back Around" 
"I Need You Now"
"Heart Skips a Beat"
"24 Hrs"
"Deeper"
"Dear Darlin'"
"That's the Way (I Like It)" / "Never Too Much" / "She's Got That Vibe" / "Jump Around" / "U Can't Touch This" / "Can't Stop the Feeling!"
"Troublemaker"
"Dance with Me Tonight"
Encore
"Kiss Me" 
"Years & Years"

Tour dates

Festivals and other miscellaneous performances

Teenage Cancer Trust Concert
Ladies Day
Forestry Commission Live Music
Summer Music Saturday
Sure Big Gig in the Park
Concerts at the Castle
Live in the City
Lytham Festival
Kings Park Summer Concerts
An Evening at the Races
Newmarket Nights
Carfest South
Big Feastival
Victorious Festival

Box office score data

Accolades
Ranked #1 on Billboard's "Hot Tours" for the week ending in 18 April 2017.

External links

References

2017 concert tours